Ocumare de la Costa is a small coastal town and the capital of the Ocumare de la Costa de Oro Municipality, located 25 miles north of Aragua, Venezuela. Called simply Ocumare, the colonial town sits at the skirts of the Venezuelan Coastal Range, adding the peculiar natural elements of the Henri Pittier National Park. Production of cocoa and fishing are the main industries in Ocumare. The valley leads into the Caribbean Sea, making Ocumare's beaches an important touristic area in the country.

Ocumare was colonized in the 17th century led by Spanish captain Lorenzo Martínez Madrid and incorporated in 1731. The original inhabitants of the area were indigenous tribes under Cacique “Barriga”.

Now, there are 5 big families related from the original population. The Echenagucia, Concepción (David Concepción, famous baseball player is a member of this family ), Gonzalez, Arias and Solorzano. Now this family is around Venezuela, principally in Maracay, Caracas, Valencia and Margarita.

Populated places in Aragua